is a private university in Kazo, Saitama, Japan, established in 1996.

External links
 Official website 

Educational institutions established in 1996
Private universities and colleges in Japan
Universities and colleges in Saitama Prefecture
Kazo, Saitama
1996 establishments in Japan